Patola (Finnish), Dammen (Swedish) is a northern-central neighborhood of Helsinki, Finland.

Neighbourhoods of Helsinki